Binod Poudel is a Nepali film director and writer. He made his directorial debut with Bulbul in 2019.

Filmography

Awards and nominations

References

External links 
 

Living people
Nepalese film directors
Nepalese screenwriters
Year of birth missing (living people)
21st-century Nepalese screenwriters
21st-century Nepalese film directors